The men's pole vault event  at the 1989 IAAF World Indoor Championships was held at the Budapest Sportcsarnok in Budapest on 3 and 4 March.

Results

Qualification

Qualification: 5.45 metres (Q) or the best 12 (q) qualified for the final

Final

References

Pole vault
Pole vault at the World Athletics Indoor Championships